Trends is a series of 16 review journals in a range of areas of biology and chemistry published under its Cell Press imprint by Elsevier. The publisher in lieu is Danielle Loughlin.

The Trends series was established in 1976 with Trends in Biochemical Sciences, rapidly followed by Trends in Neurosciences, Trends in Pharmacological Sciences, and Immunology Today. 

Immunology Today, Parasitology Today, and Molecular Medicine Today changed their names to Trends in... in 2001. Drug Discovery Today was spun off as an independent brand.

Titles 
The current set of Trends journals are all published monthly:

References

External links

Academic journal series
Cell Press academic journals
English-language journals
Monthly journals
Publications established in 1976